Adriano José Viana Moreira (born 30 January 1983), known simply as Adriano, is a Portuguese retired footballer who played as a goalkeeper.

Football career
Adriano was born in Póvoa de Varzim. After graduating from hometown Varzim SC's youth ranks, he started his senior career in amateur football, moving straight to the Primeira Liga two years after as he signed with Rio Ave FC.

However, Adriano's stay at Vila do Conde was not a happy one, has he only appeared in three league matches– nine overall – during three-and-a-half seasons (the last two spent in the second division), playing second-fiddle to Spaniard Miguel Mora.

In January 2008, Adriano was purchased by Romanian club CS Pandurii Târgu Jiu but, unsettled, returned to his country and joined C.F. União (third level). The following summer he stayed in that tier, moving to C.A. Valdevez.

References

External links

1983 births
Living people
People from Póvoa de Varzim
Portuguese footballers
Association football goalkeepers
Primeira Liga players
Liga Portugal 2 players
Segunda Divisão players
Varzim S.C. players
Rio Ave F.C. players
C.F. União players
CS Pandurii Târgu Jiu players
Portuguese expatriate footballers
Expatriate footballers in Romania
Portuguese expatriate sportspeople in Romania
Sportspeople from Porto District